The Mbarara–Nkenda High Voltage Power Line is a high voltage electricity power line, connecting the high voltage substation in the city of Mbarara, in the Western Region to another high voltage substation at Nkenda, also in the Western Region of Uganda.

Location
The 132 kilo Volt power line starts at the Uganda Electricity Transmission Company Limited (UETCL) 132kV substation at Mbarara, Mbarara District, the largest city in Uganda's Western Region.

Overview
The power line was developed as part of plans to improve grid power delivery and reliability to the districts in the Western Region of Uganda. The power line also picks up the power generated by about 5 to 6 small hydro projects in the Rwenzori Region for integration into the national grid. A loan obtained from the French Development Agency (AFD), was used in funding the construction of this power line, including a 132/33kV substation at Mbarara.

Construction
Work on this power transmission line began in 2014. Completion was initially planned for 2015. However due to delays with land acquisition, completion was not achieved until February 2019. In addition to funding from the French Development Agency, the African Development Bank lent US$34 million (UShs122.4 billion), towards the construction of this power transmission project.

See also
Energy in Uganda
List of power stations in Uganda

References

External links
Website of the Uganda Electricity Transmission Company Limited
Delays cited in power line construction projects As of 26 October 2015.

High-voltage transmission lines in Uganda
Energy infrastructure in Africa
Energy in Uganda